Crime in Chile is investigated by the Chilean police. However, unlike the majority of Latin America, criminal activity in Chile is low, making Chile one of the most stable and safest nations in the region. Various analysts and politicians concur that in the 2020s crime in Chile is on the rise to levels similar to the rest of Latin America. Increased murder rates and illegal drug trade are attributed by some to illegal immigration, other attribute the rise of crime more generally as the result of increased globalization.

Crime by type

Murder 

In 2012, Chile had a murder rate of 3.1 per 100,000 population. There were a total of 550 murders in Chile in 2012.
In 2017, the United Nations Office on Drugs and Crime informed a rate of 4.3 intentional homicide rate per 100,000 population

Corruption 

As of 2006, there were isolated reports of government corruption in Chile. Transparency International's annual Corruption Index recorded that the Chilean public perceived the country as relatively free of corruption.

Domestic violence 

Violence against women was prevalent across all classes of Chilean society until 1994. As of the early 1990s, it was reported that domestic violence affects about fifty percent of the women in Chile. The Intrafamily Violence Law passed in 1994 was the first political measure to address violence in the home, but because the law would not pass without being accepted by both sides, the law was weak in the way it addressed victim protection and punishment for abusers. The law was later reformed in 2005. In 2019, amid the ongoing Catholic sex abuse crisis in Chile, non-retroactive legislation was passed removing the statute of limitations for trying people for committing sex abuse against children in Chile.

Historical crime

Banditry and piracy

During the 19th and early 20th century banditry was widespread in Araucanía and Central Chile.

References